Hurlyburly is a dark comedy play by David Rabe, first staged in 1984. The title refers to dialogue from Shakespeare's Macbeth.

Plot
Hurlyburly depicts the intersecting lives of several low-to-mid-level Hollywood players in the 1980s. Fueled by large quantities of drugs, they attempt to find meaning in their isolated, empty lives.

Title
The title (meaning "noisy confusion" or "tumult") is derived from dialogue in Act I, Scene I of Shakespeare's Macbeth:

First Witch: "When shall we three meet again / In thunder, lightning, or in rain?"
Second Witch: "When the hurlyburly's done, / When the battle's lost and won."

Production history
The play's first staging was produced by the Goodman Theatre in Chicago.  It opened Off-Broadway at Manhattan's Promenade Theatre in June 1984. The Broadway production, directed by Mike Nichols, opened on August 7, 1984 at the Ethel Barrymore Theatre, where it ran for 343 performances. The original cast included William Hurt, Christopher Walken, Harvey Keitel, Jerry Stiller, Judith Ivey, Sigourney Weaver, and Cynthia Nixon.

Nixon was performing in The Real Thing at the same time. (The timing of her entrance and exit in each play allowed her to run back and forth between the two theatres, located two blocks from each other.) Replacements later in the run included Danny Aiello, Susan Anton, Christine Baranski, Frank Langella, Ron Silver, John Rubinstein and Candice Bergen.

In 1997, a version opened in the West End at the Old Vic, starring Daniel Craig, Rupert Graves, Andy Serkis, David Tennant, Jenny Seagrove, and Susannah Doyle.

A 2005 Off-Broadway revival was produced by The New Group, and starred Ethan Hawke, Josh Hamilton, Bobby Cannavale, Parker Posey, Wallace Shawn, Halley Wegryn Gross, and Catherine Kellner. Elizabeth Berkley took over from Catherine Kellner and received much praise, with Charles Isherwood of The New York Times even going as far as apologizing to her for his past criticisms of her ability, stating that the fact she held "her own among this skilled company of scene-stealers is a testament to how much her talent has grown". The production received critical acclaim and garnered a Drama Desk Award nomination for Outstanding Revival of a Play.

Awards and nominations

Tony Award for Best Play (nominee)
Drama Desk Award for Outstanding Revival of a Play (2005 production by The New Group, nominee)

Film adaptation

Rabe wrote the screenplay for a 1998 film version directed by Anthony Drazan. He condensed the action into two hours and updated the setting from the mid-1980s to the late 1990s. The cast included Sean Penn, Kevin Spacey, Chazz Palminteri, Robin Wright Penn, Garry Shandling, Anna Paquin, and Meg Ryan. Penn's performance won him the Volpi Cup and Drazan was nominated for the Golden Lion at the Venice Film Festival. Penn also was nominated Best Male Lead at the Independent Spirit Awards.

References

External links 

1984 plays
Broadway plays
Off-Broadway plays
Plays by David Rabe
Comedy plays
Plays set in Los Angeles
Fiction set in the 1980s
American plays adapted into films